Bertalan Dunay (29 October 1877 – 27 February 1961) was a Hungarian fencer. He competed in the individual sabre and foil events at the 1912 Summer Olympics.

References

External links
 

1877 births
1961 deaths
Hungarian male sabre fencers
Olympic fencers of Hungary
Fencers at the 1912 Summer Olympics
Sportspeople from Borsod-Abaúj-Zemplén County
Hungarian male foil fencers